Cho Dharman (born 8 August 1953) is an Indian Tamil writer. He was born in Kovilpatti Taluk in Tuticorin district of Tamil Nadu. The real name is S. Dharmaraj. Cho Dharman's novel Koogai, a stunning account of Tamil lives in post-independence India, was translated into English as The Owl. Cho, has authored nine books, won several awards and much critical acclaim for his novels, non-fiction and short stories. He won the Sahitya Akademi award in 2019 under Tamil language category for his novel Sool.

Books
 (Sool /சூல்)
 Thoorvai (தூர்வை)
 Cho. Dharman Kadhaigal
 Eeram
 Sokavanam
 Koogai: The Owl
 (Pathimoonaavathu maiyyavaadi /பதிமூனாவது மையவாடி)

Awards and honours 

 Sahitya Academy Award Winner at 2019

References

External links

பதிமூனாவது மையவாடி’: இலக்கியமா, பிரச்சாரமா?-https://www.hindutamil.in/news/literature/568784-book-review.html

Tamil writers
1953 births
Living people
Recipients of the Sahitya Akademi Award in Tamil
20th-century Indian writers
21st-century Indian writers